The Society of Rural Physicians of Canada (commonly referred to by its acronym SRPC) was founded in 1992 by a group of physicians in Mount Forest, Ontario. The SRPC National Head office is located in Shawville, Quebec

Awards
The Keith Award - Awarded to a deserving medical school
The Rural Service Award - Awarded to doctors who have served their rural communities for 10 or more years.

External links
The Official Website of the Society of Rural Physicians of Canada

Medical and health organizations based in Quebec